Falak Sher may refer to:

Falak Sar (Swat), a mountain in Pakistan
Falak Sher (justice) (born 1943), former Justice of Supreme Court of Pakistan and former Justice of Lahore High Court